Jiří Hudler (born 4 January 1984) is a Czech former professional ice hockey forward. He played with the Detroit Red Wings, Calgary Flames, Florida Panthers and the Dallas Stars of the National Hockey League (NHL). After beginning his career in the Czech Extraliga with HC Vsetín, Hudler was drafted by the Detroit Red Wings in the 2002 NHL Entry Draft and won the Stanley Cup with the club in 2008. Hudler also played for Dynamo Moscow in the Kontinental Hockey League (KHL) for one season before the team was merged to form UHC Dynamo.

Playing career

Early years
Hudler spent his youth in the elite Czech Extraliga with HC Vsetín, beginning in the 1999–2000 season. After recording a point-per-game season with the club in 2001–02, he was drafted by the Detroit Red Wings with their first pick in the second round, 58th overall, of the 2002 NHL Entry Draft. He remained in the Extraliga the following season, including a brief stint with Ak Bars Kazan of the Russian Superleague (RSL), before moving to North America for the 2003–04 season. Although he competed in 12 games for the Red Wings that season, he played the majority of the campaign with Detroit's American Hockey League (AHL) affiliate, the Grand Rapids Griffins, scoring 49 points in 57 games in his rookie AHL season. Due to the 2004–05 NHL lockout, Hudler remained in the AHL the following season while also returning to play with Vsetín for seven games. Although NHL play resumed in 2005–06, he played his third season with the Griffins, breaking-out with 36 goals and 96 points in 76 games to be named to the AHL Second All-Star Team. His 60 assists established a single-season Griffins team-record.

Hudler finally broke through onto the Red Wings roster in 2006–07 and scored 25 points in 76 games to be chosen team rookie of the year by the Detroit Sports Broadcasters Association. No one in the NHL scored more goals in fewer average minutes per game (10:02) than Hudler. Hudler played sporadically in the 2007 playoffs, however, often splitting time with Kyle Calder. He contributed two assists in six games. Former Wings teammate and fellow Czech Robert Lang took Hudler under his wing when Hudler joined the team. Hudler spent time living in Lang's home when he first arrived in the United States, and Lang even went so far as to call Hudler "a third son". Following his rookie NHL season, Hudler spent time during the off-season training with fellow NHLers Chris Chelios, Mathieu Schneider and Rob Blake in Southern California. As a result, he said that he felt faster and stronger.

Playing in his second full season with the Red Wings, Hudler improved to 42 points. On 4 June 2008, he won the Stanley Cup as a member of the Red Wings, scoring five goals and adding nine assists during Detroit's successful playoff run, including the game-winning goal in Game 4 of the Finals against the Pittsburgh Penguins. He continued to improve in 2008–09, notching 23 goals and 57 points. However, facing the Penguins once again in the Finals, Hudler and the Red Wings failed to defend their championship, losing in seven games.

Dynamo Moscow
Becoming a restricted free agent in the off-season, Hudler filed for arbitration with the Red Wings. However, soon thereafter, he signed a contract with Dynamo Moscow of the Kontinental Hockey League (KHL) for $10 million over two years on 8 July 2009, while his arbitration case with the Red Wings was later settled at $5.75 million over the same term. In response to Hudler's signing with Dynamo Moscow, USA Hockey filed an appeal to the International Ice Hockey Federation (IIHF) alleging that Hudler was still under contract with the Red Wings. Pending the IIHF's investigation, Hudler was not granted a transfer card, which would have either prevented him from playing in the KHL or caused the league sanctions. The IIHF later approved Hudler's KHL contract on 9 September 2009, revealing that although Hudler's agent had filed for the arbitration case on his client's behalf, Hudler had not actually signed for the case himself, rendering the arbitration case invalid. Further, the IIHF ruled that USA Hockey had failed to submit their appeal within the required timeline.

Return to Detroit
After one season with Dynamo Moscow, Hudler was released by the team on 18 April 2010, just four days before Dynamo was merged into "UHC Dynamo" (later to return to "Dynamo Moscow"). Eight days later, Hudler returned to the same Red Wings team he had left following his 2009 arbitration case, for two years at $2.875 million per season, the same contract he would have received in arbitration in 2009. Despite reaching a settlement with the team, he was ineligible to return for the 2010 playoffs, as he was not an active roster player before the NHL trade deadline. Hudler would return for the 2010–11 season.

Calgary Flames
On 2 July 2012, Hudler signed a four-year, $16 million contract with the Calgary Flames worth $4 million per year. In the 2014–15 season, Hudler set career-highs in NHL points, scoring 76 points in 78 games and helping the Flames reach the Stanley Cup playoffs for the first time in six years. He was also nominated for the Lady Byng Trophy, awarded to the NHL's most sportsmanlike player, which he was named the winner of on 24 June.

Florida Panthers and Dallas Stars
During the 2015–16 season, on 27 February 2016, Hudler, in the final year of his contract with the Flames, was traded to the Florida Panthers in exchange for second- and fourth-round picks in the 2016 and 2018 NHL Entry Drafts, respectively.

Becoming a free agent in the subsequent off-season, on 23 August 2016, Hudler signed a one-year, $2 million contract with the Dallas Stars.

Airplane incident
On October 4, 2017, it was reported that Hudler has been accused of a belligerent outburst on a flight from New York to Prague. Reportedly, he asked a flight attendant for cocaine and when he did not get it, he threatened to have her murdered and attempted to urinate on a food cart.

Career statistics

Regular season and playoffs

International

Awards and records 
 2005–06 — AHL Second All-Star Team
 2005–06 — AHL Grand Rapids Griffins team record with 60 assists.
 2006–07 — Hudler was named "Detroit Red Wings Rookie of the Year" by the Detroit Sports Broadcasters Association.
 2007–08 — NHL Stanley Cup (Detroit Red Wings)
 2014–15 — Lady Byng Memorial Trophy

References

External links 
 

1984 births
Living people
Ak Bars Kazan players
Czech ice hockey right wingers
Dallas Stars players
Detroit Red Wings draft picks
Detroit Red Wings players
HC Dynamo Moscow players
Czech expatriate ice hockey players in Russia
Florida Panthers players
Grand Rapids Griffins players
HC Lev Praha players
Sportspeople from Olomouc
Stanley Cup champions
VHK Vsetín players
Lady Byng Memorial Trophy winners
Czech expatriate ice hockey players in Canada
Czech expatriate ice hockey players in the United States